Georges "Butz" Wengler (14 November 1918 – 17 May 2004) was a Luxembourgian gymnast. He competed in eight events at the 1948 Summer Olympics.

References

External links
 

1918 births
2004 deaths
Luxembourgian male artistic gymnasts
Olympic gymnasts of Luxembourg
Gymnasts at the 1948 Summer Olympics
Sportspeople from Luxembourg City
20th-century Luxembourgian people